Rose Township is located in Shelby County, Illinois, USA. As of the 2010 census, its population was 1,848 and it contained 818 housing units.

Geography

Demographics

References

External links
City-data.com
Illinois State Archives

In this county is the historic church, St. Georges Cathedral, founded in 1852. Being one of the oldest churches in the United States, St. Georges is being well kept, and they now only have services on important holidays.

Townships in Shelby County, Illinois
Townships in Illinois